Hemang Patel (born 20 November 1998) is an Indian cricketer. He made his List A debut for Gujarat in the 2018–19 Vijay Hazare Trophy on 25 September 2018. He made his Twenty20 debut for Gujarat in the 2018–19 Syed Mushtaq Ali Trophy on 21 February 2019.

References

External links
 

1998 births
Living people
Indian cricketers
Gujarat cricketers
Place of birth missing (living people)